The 2012 United States Senate election in Utah took place on November 6, 2012, concurrently with the 2012 U.S. presidential election as well as other elections to the United States Senate and House of Representatives and as various state and local elections. Incumbent Republican U.S. Senator Orrin Hatch won re-election to a seventh term against the Democratic candidate, former state Senator and IBM executive Scott Howell, in a rematch of the 2000 Senate election. This would be the last time Hatch was elected to the Senate before his retirement in 2018.

Background 
Orrin Hatch won re-election to a sixth term after winning 62.5% of the vote against Pete Ashdown in the 2006 U.S. senatorial election in Utah. Tea Party activists have targeted Hatch for a primary challenge, similar to the victory of Mike Lee over Bob Bennett in the 2010 election.

Republican nomination

Convention

Candidates 
Declared
 Tim Aalders, radio talk show host and former business manager
 Dale Ash, retired sales manager
 Arlan Brunson, small business owner
 David Chiu
 Kevin Fisk, small business owner
 Jeremy Friedbaum, small business owner and candidate for the U.S. Senate in 2010
 Orrin Hatch, incumbent U.S. Senator
 Chris Herrod, State Representative
 William "Dub" Lawrence
 Dan Liljenquist, former State Senator

Declined
 Jason Chaffetz, U.S. Representative
 Jon Huntsman, Jr., former Ambassador to China, former Governor of Utah, former Ambassador to Singapore and candidate for President in 2012
 David Kirkham, co-founder of the Utah tea party
 Morgan Philpot, former state representative and 2010 congressional candidate
 Mark Shurtleff, Utah Attorney General

Campaign 
In 2006, incumbent Orrin Hatch won re-election to a sixth term. In 2008, Chaffetz defeated the incumbent Republican U.S. Representative, Chris Cannon, in the 2008 primary for Utah's 3rd congressional district. In 2010, Mike Lee defeated Bob Bennett in the 2010 Utah Senate election. In March 2011, just-elected U.S. Senator Mike Lee said he will not endorse Hatch in the primary. In May 2011, Chaffetz told several Utah political insiders that he plans to run. He said he won't make an official decision until after Labor Day of 2011.

In June 2011, prominent conservative radio talk show host Mark Levin endorsed Hatch.  The fiscally conservative 501(c)4 organization Club for Growth encouraged Chaffetz to run. The group cited Hatch's support for the Troubled Asset Relief Program, State Children's Health Insurance Program, No Child Left Behind Act, Bridge to Nowhere, and other votes among the reasons why they opposed his re-election. In an interview with Politico, Chaffetz stated, "After 34 years of service, I think most Utahans want a change. They want to thank him for his service, but it's time to move on. And for me personally, I think he's been on the wrong side of a host of major issues." The congressman cited Hatch's vote in favor of Equal Opportunity to Serve Act and the Health Equity and Access Reform Today Act of 1993. However, Chaffetz ultimately decided against a run.

Endorsements

Polling 
In a January 2012 UtahPolicy.com poll of 1,291 Salt Lake County Republican caucus participants, 42% went for Hatch, 23% Liljenquist, 5% Herrod, and 30% were undecided.  In a January 28, 2012 straw poll of 194 votes at the Box Elder County Republican Party Lincoln Day Dinner, 42% went for Liljenquist, 41% for Hatch, and 17% for Herrod.

Results

Primary

Candidates 
 Orrin Hatch, incumbent U.S. Senator
 Dan Liljenquist, former state senator

Campaign 
After the convention, Hatch had $3 million more than Liljenquist.

Endorsements

Polling

Results

Democratic nomination

Candidates 
Declared
 Pete Ashdown, businessman and nominee for the U.S. Senate in 2006
 Scott Howell, former state senator and nominee for the U.S. Senate in 2000

Results 
Howell defeated Ashdown 63%-37% to win and avoid a primary.

General election

Candidates 
 Orrin Hatch (Republican), incumbent U.S. Senator
 Scott Howell (Democratic), former state senator and nominee for the U.S. Senate in 2000
 Shaun McCausland (Constitution)
 Daniel Geery (Justice)
 Bill Barron (Independent)

Debates 
Complete video of debate, October 17, 2012 - C-SPAN

Fundraising

Top contributors

Top industries

Predictions

Polling 

with Dan Liljenquist

with Jason Chaffetz

with Orrin Hatch

Republican primary

Results

See also 
 2012 United States Senate elections
 2012 United States House of Representatives elections in Utah
 2012 Utah gubernatorial election

References

External links 
 Utah Government Services – Elections
 Campaign finances at OpenSecrets.org
 Outside spending at Sunlight Foundation
 Candidates issue positions at On the Issues

Official campaign websites
 Bill Barron for Senate
 Daniel Geery for Senate
 Orrin Hatch for Senate
 Scott Howell for Senate
 Shaun McCausland for Senate

2012 Utah elections
Utah
2012